Kushneria indalinina is a moderately halophilic, Gram-negative, aerobic and motile bacterium from the genus of Kushneria which has been isolated from a solar saltern from Cabo de Gata.

References

Oceanospirillales
Bacteria described in 2007